Pleasant Valley is an unincorporated community in Center Township, Martin County, in the U.S. state of Indiana.

History
A post office was established at Pleasant Valley in 1850, and remained in operation until 1859. The community was named from its scenic setting.

Geography
Pleasant Valley is located at  along State Road 550 in the Hoosier National Forest.

References

Unincorporated communities in Martin County, Indiana
Unincorporated communities in Indiana